Bangarda Kural is a 2012 Tulu language film directed by Ram Shetty starring Shivdwaj, Pakhi Hegde in the lead roles and Namratha Hegde, Machendranath Pandeshwar, Anand Shetty, Kishori Ballal, Shobha Rai, Chanchalakshi Bhat, Suresh, Harish, Aravind Bolar, Dinesh Attavar,
Vasu Shetty Mumbai, Tonse Vijay Kumar Shetty, Pradeep Chandra, Bhagya Rai, Jyothi Rai, Ashwini etc., in supporting roles. Bangarda Kural is produced under the banner of  Anand Films by Ram Shetty. Music released by Muzik247 Tulu

References

2012 films